Dharmapuram is a village near Srikakulam town in Ponduru Mandal Division in Andhra Pradesh, India.

Villages in Srikakulam district